The Mexican Southeast League was a short-season Class-A circuit in Minor league baseball which operated from 1964 through 1970. Throughout its existence, the MSL served as a farm system for the Class Triple-A Mexican League.

Cities/Teams/Years

Championship teams
 1964 – Plataneros de Tabasco
 1965 – Plataneros de Tabasco
 1966 – Piratas de Campeche
 1967 – Piratas de Campeche
 1968 – Piratas de Campeche
 1969 – Camaroneros de Campeche
 1970 – Piratas de Campeche

Noted players

 Pompeyo Davalillo
 Pancho Herrera
 Minnie Miñoso
 Héctor Rodríguez
 Celerino Sánchez
 Angel Scull
 René Valdés
 Benny Valenzuela

Sources
 Johnson, Lloyd; Wolff, Miles (1993). Encyclopedia of Minor League Baseball. Baseball America. 
 Treto Cisneros, Pedro (2002). The Mexican League/La Liga Mexicana: Comprehensive Player Statistics, 1937-2001. McFarland & Company. 

1964 establishments in Mexico
Defunct baseball leagues in Mexico
Sports leagues disestablished in 1970
Sports leagues established in 1964